József Dobronyi (17 June 1917 – 24 March 1993) was a Hungarian athlete who came in 7th place in the men's marathon at the 1952 Summer Olympics in Helsinki.

Dobronyi was born and died in Budapest.

References
 Sports Reference

1917 births
1993 deaths
Athletes from Budapest
Athletes (track and field) at the 1952 Summer Olympics
Hungarian male long-distance runners
Hungarian male marathon runners
Olympic athletes of Hungary
20th-century Hungarian people